The 2000 IIHF World Championship was held in Saint Petersburg, Russia from 29 April to 14 May.

Qualification
This was the final year for qualifying rounds (except 'Far East').  Five teams advanced out of the eight that participated in the two European groups.  The top two from each group played in the World Championship, and the third place teams played off against each other for the final spot.  Both groups were played 11–14 November 1999.

Group 1 (Great Britain) 
Played in Sheffield

Group 2 (France)
Played in Amiens

Playoff (Netherlands)
Played in Eindhoven

Far East (Japan)
Played 3–5 September 1999 in Aomori.

Venues

Preliminary round
Like the previous two years, sixteen nations played in four groups of four.  However this year the format was modified so that the top three teams from each group would advance to a group of six, carrying forward the results against the teams who advanced with them.  The nations from the first and fourth pools were grouped together, likewise the second and third pools.  The fourth placed teams were put in a group together to contest relegation.

Group A

Group B

Group C

Group D

Relegation round

Group G
The relegation round is composed of the four teams that placed last in Groups A through D.  They play in a round-robin fashion, with the last placed team that is not the far east qualifier, being relegated to the Division I group in next year's World Championships.

 is relegated to Division I.  will play together with China and Korea in 2001 IIHF World Championship Far East Qualification Tournament

Qualifying round

Group E

Group F

Final round

Bracket

Quarterfinals

Semifinals

Bronze medal game

Final

Ranking and statistics

Tournament Awards
Best players selected by the directorate:
Best Goaltender:       Roman Čechmánek
Best Defenceman:       Petteri Nummelin
Best Forward:          Miroslav Šatan
Most Valuable Player:  Martin Procházka
Media All-Star Team:
Goaltender:  Roman Čechmánek
Defence:  Petteri Nummelin,  Michal Sýkora
Forwards:  Jiří Dopita,  Miroslav Šatan,  Tomáš Vlasák

Final standings
The final standings of the tournament according to IIHF:

Scoring leaders
List shows the top skaters sorted by points, then goals. If the list exceeds 10 skaters because of a tie in points, all of the tied skaters are left out.

Leading goaltenders
Only the top five goaltenders, based on save percentage, who have played 40% of their team's minutes are included in this list.

See also 
 2000 IIHF Women's World Championship
 2000 World Junior Ice Hockey Championships

Citations

References
Complete results at Passionhockey.com

Group A official results
Official results for qualifiers

 
IIHF World Championship
1
World Ice Hockey Championships - Men's
World
2000
April 2000 sports events in Europe
May 2000 sports events in Europe
Sports competitions in Saint Petersburg
IIHF World Championship